Deputy cup-bearer was since the 13th century a court office in Poland and later in Lithuania. Deputy cup-bearer was the deputy of the cup-bearer, with the time more important than his superior. 

Since the 14th–16th century an honorable court title and a district office in Crown of Poland and Grand Duchy of Lithuania, and later Polish–Lithuanian Commonwealth.

 podczaszy wielki koronny – Great Royal Deputy Cup-bearer of the Crown
 podczaszy wielki litewski – Great Royal Deputy Cup-bearer of Lithuania
 podczaszy koronny – Royal Deputy Cup-bearer of the Crown
 podczaszy litewski – Royal Deputy Cup-bearer of Lithuania
 podczaszy ziemski – District Royal Deputy Cup-bearer

See also
Offices in the Polish–Lithuanian Commonwealth

Polish titles
Lithuanian titles